Maha Yaza Dewi was a principal queen consort of King Binnya Ran II of Hanthawaddy. She was the second-ranked queen (after the chief queen) of the king in 1495.

Notes

References

Bibliography
 

Queens consort of Hanthawaddy